The 1898 Arkansas gubernatorial election was held on September 5, 1898. Incumbent Democratic Governor Daniel W. Jones defeated Republican nominee Henry F. Auten and Populist nominee W. Scott Morgan with 67.35% of the vote.

General election

Candidates
Daniel W. Jones, Democratic, incumbent Governor of Arkansas
Henry Franklin Auten, Republican, lawyer
Winfield Scott Morgan, Populist, newspaper editor
Alexander McKnight, Prohibition

Results

Notes

References

1898
Arkansas
Gubernatorial